Raven Rock is an unincorporated community and hamlet along the Delaware River approximately  north of Stockton along New Jersey Route 29. The hamlet was known earlier as Saxtonville. It is located within Delaware Township in Hunterdon County, New Jersey, United States. It is the site of Bull's Island Recreation Area. The rock outcrop for which it is named is the southwest corner of the Hunterdon Plateau. 

The Lumberville–Raven Rock Bridge is a free pedestrian bridge over the Delaware River, owned and operated by the Delaware River Joint Toll Bridge Commission. The bridge, formerly a road bridge from 1856 to 1944, connects Bull's Island Recreation Area to Lumberville, Solebury Township, Pennsylvania.

From 1852 to 1952 the Pennsylvania Railroad operated a passenger stop in Raven Rock via their Belvidere Division. This segment of the railroad continued to be used for freight until 1978 when the line closed and was subsequently demolished for a recreational trail in the early 1980s.

The Raven Rock Historic District was added to the National Register of Historic Places on November 10, 2015 for its significance in community development and architecture.

Gallery

References

Delaware Township, Hunterdon County, New Jersey
Unincorporated communities in Hunterdon County, New Jersey
Unincorporated communities in New Jersey